Kalaparusha Maurice McIntyre (March 24, 1936 – November 9, 2013) was an American free jazz tenor saxophonist.

Biography
McIntyre, who was born in Clarksville, Arkansas, United States, but raised in Chicago, Illinois, studied at the Chicago College of Music, and during the 1960s began playing with musicians such as Malachi Favors, Muhal Richard Abrams, and Roscoe Mitchell. Along with them he became a member of the ensemble Association for the Advancement of Creative Musicians in 1965. His first solo record appeared in 1969. During this time he also recorded as a session musician for Delmark Records, playing with George Freeman, J.B. Hutto, and Little Milton, among others.

That year, McIntyre was convicted for drug offences, and served his sentence in Lexington, Kentucky; a prison friend of his at the time was Tadd Dameron.

McIntyre moved to New York City in the 1970s, playing at Sam Rivers's Rivbea Studios and teaching at Karl Berger's Creative Studio. He and Muhal Richard Abrams toured Europe several times. After his 1981 live album, McIntyre recorded very little, playing on the streets and in the subways of New York. His next major appearance on record was not until 1998, with Pheeroan akLaff and Michael Logan; the following year, he played with many AACM ensemble members on the album Bright Moments. He continued to release as a leader into the 2000s.

He died in November 2013, in The Bronx, New York, at the age of 77.

Discography

As leader
Humility in the Light of the Creator (Delmark, 1969)
Forces and Feelings (Delmark, 1970)
Kwanza (Baystate, 1978)
Peace and Blessings (Black Saint, 1979)
Ram's Run (Cadence, 1981)
Return of the Lost Tribe (Delmark, 1997) as Bright Moments with Joseph Jarman, Kahil El'Zabar, Malachi Favors and Adegoke Steve Colson
Dream of... (CIMP, 1998)
South Eastern (CIMP, 2002)
The Moment (Entropy Stereo, 2003)
Morning Song (Delmark, 2004)
Paths to Glory (CIMP, 2004)
Extremes (CIMP, 2007)

As sideman
With Muhal Richard Abrams
Levels and Degrees of Light (Delmark, 1968)
With Ethnic Heritage Ensemble
Welcome (Leo, 1982)
With George Freeman
Birth Sign (Delmark, 1970)
With Leroy Jenkins
For Players Only (JCOA, 1975)
With Roscoe Mitchell
Sound (Delmark, 1966)

References

1936 births
2013 deaths
American jazz tenor saxophonists
American male saxophonists
Free jazz saxophonists
Avant-garde jazz saxophonists
Delmark Records artists
CIMP artists
Black Saint/Soul Note artists
People from Clarksville, Arkansas
Jazz musicians from Arkansas
20th-century American saxophonists
21st-century American saxophonists
20th-century American male musicians
21st-century American male musicians
American male jazz musicians
Ethnic Heritage Ensemble members